Uncle Tom's Cabin (1927) is a silent film directed by Harry A. Pollard and released by Universal Pictures. The film is based on the 1852 novel Uncle Tom's Cabin by Harriet Beecher Stowe and was the last silent film version. A copy is preserved at the Library of Congress.

In this version of the film, all of the major slave roles, with the exception of Uncle Tom himself, were portrayed by white actors.  Actress Mona Ray played the slave Topsy in blackface, while the slaves Eliza, George, Cassie and Harry were all presented as having very light skin coloring because of mixed-race heritage. This film was released on DVD in 1999 by Kino.

The title role was originally played by the notable stage actor Charles Gilpin but he quit amid onset dissatisfaction with the depiction of the role and was replaced by James B. Lowe, reshooting the sections already filmed with Gilpin.

The film was rereleased in 1958 with sound added and narration by Raymond Massey.

Cast
Margarita Fischer as Eliza
James B. Lowe as Uncle Tom
Arthur Edmund Carewe as George Harris
George Siegmann as Simon Legree
Eulalie Jensen as Cassie
Mona Ray as Topsy
Virginia Grey as Eva St. Clare
Lassie Lou Ahern as Little Harry
Lucien Littlefield as Lawyer Marks
Adolph Milar as Mr. Tom Haley
J. Gordon Russell as Tom Loker
Gertrude Howard as Aunt Chloe, (Uncle Tom's wife)
Jack Mower as Mr. Shelby 
Vivien Oakland as Mrs. Shelby
John Roche as Augustine St. Clare
Aileen Manning as Aunt Ophelia

Unbilled
Tom Amardares – Quimbo
Gertrude Astor – Mrs. St. Clare
 Grace Carlyle –  Mrs. Fletcher
Matthew Beard – Child
Louise Beavers – Slave at Wedding
William Dyer – G.M. Beard – Auctioneer
Francis Ford – Captain
Eugene Jackson – Child
Carla Laemmle – Auction Spectator
Jeanette Loff – Auction Spectator
Nelson McDowell – Phineas Fletcher
Rolfe Sedan – Adolph
Madame Sul-Te-Wan – Slave at Wedding
Dick Sutherland – Sambo
Clarence Wilson – Bidder at Eliza's Auction

See also
List of films featuring slavery

References

External links
 
 

1927 films
American silent feature films
American black-and-white films
Films based on American novels
Films based on works by Harriet Beecher Stowe
Universal Pictures films
Films about American slavery
Films directed by Harry A. Pollard
1920s historical drama films
American historical drama films
Uncle Tom's Cabin
Blackface minstrel shows and films
1927 drama films
Surviving American silent films
1920s American films
Silent American drama films
1920s English-language films